Mariette may signify:

Family name
Auguste Mariette (1821–1881), pioneering Egyptologist.
Pierre-Jean Mariette (1694–1774), connoisseur and chronicler of artistic life in Paris

Given name
Mariette Bosch (died 2001), South African murderer executed by Botswana
Mariette Hansson (born 1983), sometimes MaryJet or simply mononym Mariette, Swedish singer and songwriter

Others
Mariette, a yacht built by Nathanael Greene Herreshoff in 1915